Xenoseius is a genus of mites in the family Ascidae.

Species
 Xenoseius clayi (Evans & Hyatt, 1960)      
 Xenoseius elizae Halliday, Walter & Lindquist, 1998

References

Ascidae